Scott Rickards (born 3 November 1981 in Sutton Coldfield, England) is a professional footballer, who works as an academy coach for Derby County.

Career
Rickards left Redditch United to join Alfreton Town on 9 August 2007.

Rickards then went on to play for Halesowen Town having signed in 2009.

Coaching and later career

Rainworth Miners Welfare
In the summer 2013, Rickards joined Rainworth Miners Welfare and was later appointed caretaker manager. Rickards impressed the management committee in his short tenure as caretaker manager and on 23 September the club confirmed, that he had been hired permanently and also would continue to play for the club. In August 2014, Rickard resigned from his position due to personal reasons.

Mansfield Town and Tamworth
In March 2015, Rickards was appointed Head Of Recruitment and academy coach at Mansfield Town and two months later, he also joined Highgate United as a player, where he also later functioned as a 1st team coach/assistant.

In the summer 2017, he was hired as an academy coach at his former club Tamworth and was in February 2018 promoted to 1st team assistant which he would combine with his existing full-time youth development role at Mansfield Town. He left his position in Tamworth in the summer 2018 and Mansfield in the summer 2019.

Derby County, return to Tamworth and Atherstone
In September 2019 it was confirmed, that Rickards had returned to his former childhood club Derby County in an under-13s coaching role and at the same time, he also returned to another of his former clubs, Tamworth, to work with the club's academy.

On 28 October 2019, Rickards was also appointed manager of Atherstone Town. In mid-February 2020, Rickards resigned after racist abuse from fans in three successive matches.

Following his departure from Atherstone Town, Rickards turned out for Midland League Division Two side Coton Green.

References

External links

1981 births
Living people
Association football forwards
Sportspeople from Sutton Coldfield
Derby County F.C. players
Tamworth F.C. players
Kidderminster Harriers F.C. players
Redditch United F.C. players
Nuneaton Borough F.C. players
Brackley Town F.C. players
Solihull Moors F.C. players
Halesowen Town F.C. players
Barwell F.C. players
Bolehall Swifts F.C. players
Chasetown F.C. players
Rainworth Miners Welfare F.C. players
Walsall Wood F.C. players
A.F.C. Mansfield players
Highgate United F.C. players
Coleshill Town F.C. players
Heather St John's F.C. players
Atherstone Town F.C. players
Coton Green F.C. players
English Football League players
National League (English football) players
English footballers
Mansfield Town F.C. non-playing staff